Green Island is a suburb of Dunedin, New Zealand. Not an actual island, this former borough takes its name from the Green Island bush, uncleared native forest extending from the valley where the community is centred over the hills towards the coast. The name of the nearby offshore island — Green Island (Okaihe) — was used to identify the bush and, thus, also lent its name to the mainland suburb.

Green Island suburb
Under the 1989 local government reforms, the city of Dunedin and its surrounding region was grouped into a territorial authority called Dunedin City. Under this system, Green Island is officially an outer suburb within this territorial authority.

Along with neighbouring Abbotsford, it is the westernmost suburb within Dunedin City's main urban area. Green Island's main economy is based on light and small scale heavy industry.

Prior to 1950 Green Island, and neighbouring Burnside,  had a strong Brass Band and Silver Band communities.

Schools
Green Island School is a state full primary school serving years 1 to 8 with a roll of  students. The school first opened in 1863, and moved to the current site in 1883.

St Peter Chanel School is a Catholic state-integrated contributing primary school serving years 1 to 6. It is located on Main South Road, and has a roll of  students.

Both schools are coeducational. Rolls are as of

Sport

Green Island Rugby Club
Established in 1884 and known as "The Grizzlies". The club's colours are green and gold.  The club's home ground is Miller Park. In 2017 the club fielded three senior teams, one colts (U-20) team and a thriving school age grade consisting of 22 teams (ages 5–13). Green Island won the Premier Championship in 1972, 1973 and 1978. The clubs playing strength has dropped since the late 1990s with the decline of employment opportunities in the town and a general drop in player numbers throughout the Dunedin region, although the club has a thriving social side and a loyal band of supporters and has seen a resurgence off the field in recent years.

The club has in 2019 won the Speights Jug Trophy for winning the first round of Premier Rugby. They have also won numerous interclub trophies through this round.

The club has had six All Blacks:
Greg Cooper
Jackson Hemopo
Lyn Jaffray
Merv Jaffray
Brian McKechnie
Ben Smith

Other sport 
Green Island's football club, Green Island FC, is based at Sunnyvale Park. The park is also the home of the Green Island Cricket Club. The Cricket Club has been highly successful in recent times winning multiple national club championships. The town is also home to a successful boxing club, and Green Island Rhythmic Gymnastics Club is a nationally ranked local sporting club.

Demographics

Green Island had a population of 2,319 at the 2018 New Zealand census, an increase of 84 people (3.8%) since the 2013 census, and an increase of 36 people (1.6%) since the 2006 census. There were 948 households. There were 1,155 males and 1,164 females, giving a sex ratio of 0.99 males per female. The median age was 38.9 years (compared with 37.4 years nationally), with 435 people (18.8%) aged under 15 years, 426 (18.4%) aged 15 to 29, 1,098 (47.3%) aged 30 to 64, and 354 (15.3%) aged 65 or older.

Ethnicities were 91.3% European/Pākehā, 10.3% Māori, 2.5% Pacific peoples, 3.1% Asian, and 2.8% other ethnicities (totals add to more than 100% since people could identify with multiple ethnicities).

The proportion of people born overseas was 9.2%, compared with 27.1% nationally.

Although some people objected to giving their religion, 60.7% had no religion, 28.1% were Christian, 0.1% were Hindu, 1.0% were Muslim, 0.4% were Buddhist and 2.5% had other religions.

Of those at least 15 years old, 249 (13.2%) people had a bachelor or higher degree, and 459 (24.4%) people had no formal qualifications. The median income was $32,300, compared with $31,800 nationally. 168 people (8.9%) earned over $70,000 compared to 17.2% nationally. The employment status of those at least 15 was that 993 (52.7%) people were employed full-time, 255 (13.5%) were part-time, and 72 (3.8%) were unemployed.

Abbotsford

Immediately to the north of Green Island, and only separated from it by the State Highway and South Island Main Trunk Railway is Abbotsford. Abbotsford is also a suburb within the Dunedin City territorial authority.

References

External links
 Abbotsford landslide

Populated places in Otago
Suburbs of Dunedin